Arthur Morris (1922–2015) was an Australian cricketer.

Arthur Morris may also refer to:

 Arthur Morris (U.S. Army officer) (1843–1892), officer in the United States Army
 Arthur Morris (footballer) (1882–1945), English footballer
 Arthur Morris (bishop) (1898–1977), Anglican bishop
 Arthur E. Morris (born 1946), American politician and engineer

See also
 
 Arthur Bartlett Maurice, American editor
 Morris (surname)